The World Deaf Football Championships is a quadrennial global competitions in the association football sport for deaf people. It is organised by the International Committee of Sports for the Deaf (CISS) and was first held in 2008.

Competitions by year

Medals summary

Men

Women

See also
European Deaf Football Championships

References

 
Deaf
Deaf football competitions
Recurring sporting events established in 2008
Quadrennial sporting events
Paralympic association football
deaf
World championships in football variants